Ingjerd Egeberg (born 19 May 1967) is a Norwegian actress and theatre director.

She was born in Moelv, and graduated from the Norwegian National Academy of Theatre in 1994. She has been employed at Hålogaland Teater and Rogaland Teater, was the director of Rogaland Teater from 2000 to 2004.

References

1967 births
Living people
Norwegian stage actresses
Norwegian film actresses
Norwegian theatre directors
People from Hedmark
Oslo National Academy of the Arts alumni